Xubida circumvagans is a moth in the family Crambidae. It was described by Harrison Gray Dyar Jr. in 1922. It is found in Mexico.

References

Haimbachiini
Moths described in 1922